Branislav Knežević (born 21 July 2002) is a Serbian footballer who plays as a midfielder for Spanish club Elche Ilicitano.

Club career
On 6 September 2021, he signed a three-year contract with Spanish La Liga club Elche and was initially assigned to the reserve team Elche Ilicitano.

Career statistics

Club

Notes

References

2002 births
Sportspeople from Šabac
Living people
Serbian footballers
Serbia youth international footballers
Association football defenders
FK Mačva Šabac players
Elche CF Ilicitano footballers
Serbian SuperLiga players
Serbian expatriate footballers
Expatriate footballers in Spain
Serbian expatriate sportspeople in Spain